Philip Hanson may refer to:
 Philip Hanson (civil servant)
 Philip Hanson (racing driver)

See also
 Phil Hansen (disambiguation)